Konstantinos Beglektsis (born 5 January 1995) is a Greek footballer who plays as a striker for Palliniakos.

Club career
He made his professional debut for Panionios on 10 February 2013 against PAS Giannina F.C. on a 0-1 defeat under coach Dimitrios Eleftheropoulos.

International career
He made his international debut for Greece U18 on 5 January 2013 against Slovenia U18.

Personal
He is nephew of  former Greek international footballer Nikos Liberopoulos.

External links
 Superleaguegreece.net Profile
 

1995 births
Living people
Panionios F.C. players
Kalamata F.C. players
Paniliakos F.C. players
Super League Greece players
Footballers from Athens
Greek footballers
Association football forwards